West Poland is an unincorporated village in the town of Poland, Androscoggin County, Maine, United States. West Poland has a post office with ZIP code 04291, which opened on May 19, 1837.

References

Villages in Androscoggin County, Maine
Villages in Maine